This page shows the results of the Weightlifting Competition at the 1991 Pan American Games, held from August 2 to August 18, 1991 in Havana, Cuba. There were a total number of ten medal events, just for men and all won by hosts Cuba.

Men's competition

Flyweight (– 52 kg)

Bantamweight (– 56 kg)

Featherweight (– 60 kg)

Lightweight (– 67.5 kg)

Middleweight (– 75 kg)

Light-heavyweight (– 82.5 kg)

Middle-heavyweight (– 90 kg)

First-heavyweight (– 100 kg)

Heavyweight (– 110 kg)

Super heavyweight (+ 110 kg)

Medal table

See also
Weightlifting at the 1992 Summer Olympics

References
 Sports 123
 HickokSports

Pan American Games
Events at the 1991 Pan American Games
1991